James Playfair may refer to:
 James Playfair (architect) (1755–1794), Scottish architect
 James Playfair (minister) (1738–1819), Scottish clergyman
 James Playfair (businessman) (1860–1937), Canadian entrepreneur
 Jim Playfair (born 1964), Canadian ice hockey player
 James Playfair, a fictional character in the short story "The Blockade Runners" by Jules Verne